Oleksandr Tarasenko ( (born 12 February 1985 in Yaresky, Poltava Oblast) is a professional Ukrainian football player.

Career
He started his professional career in 2003 for FC Helios Kharkiv in the Druha Liha. In his debut season he was the team leader in goals scored with 12. The following season he won promotion to the Ukrainian First League with Helios. In 2012, he signed with FC Naftovyk-Ukrnafta Okhtyrka, after one season with Okhtyrka he was transferred to PFC Sumy.

In 2015, he went across the border in order to sign with Limanovia Limanowa in the II Liga. Within the same season he played in the I liga with Sandecja Nowy Sącz. In 2016, he signed with Izolator Boguchwała in the IV liga. In August 2017, Tarasenko signed with Polish III liga club JKS 1909 Jarosław.

References 

1985 births
Living people
FC Helios Kharkiv players
FC Naftovyk-Ukrnafta Okhtyrka players
Ukrainian footballers
PFC Sumy players
JKS 1909 Jarosław players
Sandecja Nowy Sącz players
Ukrainian expatriate footballers
Expatriate footballers in Poland
Ukrainian expatriate sportspeople in Poland
Association football forwards
Limanovia Limanowa players
Ukrainian First League players
Sportspeople from Poltava Oblast